Nina Hughes is a British professional boxer. She has held the WBA female bantamweight world title since 2022 after defeating Jamie Mitchell by decision.

Professional boxing record

References

External links
 

1982 births
Living people
People from Grays, Essex
English women boxers
Bantamweight boxers
Super-bantamweight boxers
World bantamweight boxing champions
World Boxing Association champions